Streptomyces globisporus is a soil-dwelling Gram-positive bacterium. C-1027 is produced by this species, which is one of the most potent antitumor agents.

References

Further reading

External links
Type strain of Streptomyces globisporus at BacDive -  the Bacterial Diversity Metadatabase

globisporus
Bacteria described in 1941